This is a list of electoral results for the electoral district of North Melbourne in Victorian state elections.

Members for North Melbourne
Two members initially, one from the redistribution of 1889 when Port Melbourne and other districts were created.

 = by-election
 = expelled

Election results

Elections in the 1920s

Elections in the 1910s

References

Victoria (Australia) state electoral results by district